Jhoao Santiago Ward Gallegos (born May 4, 1989 in Callao) is a Peruvian footballer who plays as a striker for Sport Áncash in the Peruvian Segunda Division.

Club career
He developed as a youth player in the popular football academy Academia Deportiva Cantolao. He moved to Alianza Lima. He then played in their youth team and was the top goalscorer of the U-20 team of Alianza Lima. In 2008, he was promoted to the first team. He never made his official debut with Alianza. In 2009, he was loaned to José Gálvez FBC.

See also
Football in Peru
List of football clubs in Peru

References

External links 
 
 

1989 births
Living people
Sportspeople from Callao
Association football forwards
Peruvian footballers
Academia Deportiva Cantolao players
Club Alianza Lima footballers
José Gálvez FBC footballers
Atlético Minero footballers
Cienciano footballers
Sport Áncash footballers
Unión Huaral footballers